is a pizza chain in Japan. Franchises of the chain are located in 26 of Japan's 47 prefectures.  The company has its headquarters in the Hiei Kudan-Kita Building in Kudankita, Chiyoda, Tokyo.

The company's slogan is "Hand made deliciousness, Local preference".

References

External links
 California site 

Food and drink companies based in Tokyo
Retail companies based in Tokyo
Minato, Tokyo
Pizza chains of Japan
Pizza franchises
Restaurants in Japan